Elachista virgatula is a moth of the family Elachistidae. It is found in Alberta, Manitoba, Saskatchewan, Arizona, Colorado, Nebraska, South Dakota and Wyoming.

The costa in the basal 1/6 of the forewing is dark brownish grey. The ground colour is white and to a variable extent and irregularly dusted with dark brown tips of scales. This dusting is often arranged as rows along the veins. The hindwings are light grey and translucent and the underside of the wings is light grey.

Etymology
The species name is derived from Latin virgatula (meaning striped).

References

Moths described in 1997
virgatula
Endemic fauna of the United States
Moths of North America